Hubahu is an Indian television miniseries. The story revolves around a pair of twin sisters who exchange places for a lark but end up getting intricately involved in each other's lives. The story is an adaption of the 1985s hit American two-part made-for-TV movie Deceptions, starring known Hollywood actors Stefanie Powers and Barry Bostwick, in which Powers starred as twins who swap places leading to dire consequences.

The series premiered on Sony Entertainment Television on 7 February 2002. The series starred Sandhya Mridul in the lead who played the characters of both sisters, Aditi and Ananya. Produced by Parvati Balagopalan and Milind Soman (Season 1) and Tony Singh and Deeya Singh (since Season 2) it was shot in Mumbai and Bangkok.

Concept
The story portrays the lives of twin sisters Aditi and Ananya who have very different personalities. Aditi is a bored and neglected housewife in Pune whose lecturer husband has no time for her. Ananya is a sophisticated art dealer in Bangkok. Bored and fed up with their own lives they decide to switch identities as a game for a week but then things go haywire.

Cast
Sandhya Mridul ... Aditi and Ananya
Rajat Kapoor
Suchitra Pillai
Tarun Raghwan
Alyy Khan

References

External links
Hubahu Official Site on Sony Entertainment Network

Sony Entertainment Television original programming
Indian drama television series
Television shows set in Maharashtra
Television shows set in Bangkok
Television series about twins